The European Book Prize is a European Union literary award established in 2007. It is organized by the association Esprit d'Europe in Paris. It seeks to promote European values, and to contribute to European citizens' better understanding of the European Union as a cultural entity.

Eligible books must have been published in one of the 27 European Union (EU) member-states in the preceding year, in the original language or a translation. Works are submitted in one of two categories: essai (which in French means, something broader than the English "essay") and romans et récits ("novels and narratives"). A long list is drawn up by the organizers in Paris; the number varies but for example, in 2011, there were 50 essais plus 47 romans et recits. These are then sent to a "sponsorship committee" which narrows it down to about a seven title shortlist, which are then given to a new committee of judges, composed of journalists and authors.

The European Book Prize is organised by the association Esprit d'Europe and was founded by France Rouqe, Luce Perrot and François-Xavier Priollaud. The prize is worth 10,000 euros to each winner. The first two years saw only one winner who received 20,000 euros.

Winners
The inaugural European Book Prize was awarded to Belgium's prime minister Guy Verhofstadt for United States of Europe. The ceremony was held at the European Parliament in Brussels on 5 December 2007.

Swedish crime fiction writer Henning Mankell handed the prize to the winner. While giving the prize, Mankell said that the jury was sensitive to the political courage showed by the current prime minister of Belgium. He added that in a Europe which has a lot of self-doubt, which has a lot of questions about its own future, Guy Verhofstadt offered a clear proposal for the future. He gave reasons to believe in European constitution.

While receiving the reward, Verhofstadt said, "When I wrote this book, I in fact meant it as a provocation against all those who didn't want the European Constitution. Fortunately, in the end a solution was found with the treaty, that was approved."

Winners by country

References

External links 

European Commission photos relating to awarding of the first Europe Book Prize on 5 December 2007 in the European Parliament in Brussels

Awards established in 2007
French fiction awards
Non-fiction literary awards